Xenaroswellianinae is a subfamily of beetles in the family Carabidae. It contains the single genus Xenaroswelliana with the single species Xenaroswelliana deltaquadrant.

References

Monotypic insect taxa
Carabidae subfamilies